Elections to the Kincardine and Deeside District Council took place in May 1988, alongside elections to the councils of Scotland's various other districts. The number of seats and the total vote share won by each party is listed below.

  

Voter turnout was 42.4%.

Other parties took 2.8% of the vote. Voter turnout was 37.4%, the lowest in Scotland.

References

1988 Scottish local elections